Palaeosilpha fraasii is an extinct species of carrion beetle that lived during the Chatti, a subdivision of the Oligocene epoch.

References

Silphidae